The women's competition in the heavyweight (– 75 kg) division was held on 10 November 2011.

Schedule

Medalists

Records

Results

New records

References

(Pages 48 & 50) Start List 
2011 IWF World Championships Results Book Pages 23–25 
Results

2011 World Weightlifting Championships
World